The fourth season of the Romanian reality talent show Vocea României premiered on ProTV on September 16, 2014. Pavel Bartoș returned as host, while Nicoleta Luciu left the show. Oana Tache replaced Vlad Roșca as the social media correspondent. Loredana Groza, Smiley and Marius Moga returned as coaches, while Tudor Chirilă replaced Horia Brenciu as the fourth coach. The show was moved from its usual Saturday evening slot to Friday evening, with the premiere on a Tuesday.

This season brought rule changes. The blind auditions were expanded from six to seven shows. The battle round was simplified by allowing coaches to steal one losing contestant only, instead of two as in the previous year, and eliminating the sing-off from the show. Thus, every coach advances with eight contestants to the live shows, as in season three. The jury/televote split in the semi-final was also changed from 50/50 to 40/60.

The season finale aired on December 19, 2014. Tiberiu Albu, initially mentored by Smiley, but stolen by Chirilă in the battle rounds, was declared winner of the season. It was Chirilă's first victory as a coach and the first time a stolen contestant had won the competition.

Overview

Early decisions 
In March 2014, ProTV announced their intention to turn season 4 into a children's competition, according to The Voice Kids format, but they changed their minds a month later and decided to have a competition for people ages 16 and up, as in previous years.

ProTV also revamped the set of the show and used better sound equipment compared to previous seasons.

Personnel changes 
Former coach Horia Brenciu left the show and was replaced with Tudor Chirilă.

Former producer Mona Segall resigned from the MediaPro trust in April 2014 and moved to the rival channel Antena 1, together with her entire team. The orchestra led by George Natsis followed them, stating that they wanted to continue working together. These decisions came in the context of a controversial series of dismissals and resignations from the media trust at the beginning of 2014, influenced by changes made by the then-newly appointed CEO of ProTV, Aleksandras Česnavičius, who was implementing a cost-saving strategy.

The fourth season of the show was produced by an international team co-ordinated by Peter Majeský and Melanie Triebel, who had previously worked on German, Czech and Slovak television productions.

The dance crew of the show, led by Edi Stancu, also migrated to Antena 1, and was replaced by the newly formed PRO Dance Crew, led by Emil Rengle.

Oana Tache replaced Vlad Roșca as the social media correspondent.

Teams 
Color key

Blind auditions 
The first phase of the competition, the blind auditions, taped August 19–21 and 26–27, 2014 at the MediaPro Studios, Buftea, began airing when the season premiered on September 16, 2014.

Color key

Episode 1 (September 16) 
The first of seven pre-recorded audition episodes aired on Tuesday, September 16, 2014. The four coaches opened the show with a medley of their songs:

The contestants featured in this episode were:

Episode 2 (September 19) 
The second episode aired on Friday, September 19, 2014.

Episode 3 (September 26) 
The third episode aired on Friday, September 26, 2014.

Episode 4 (October 3) 
The fourth episode aired on October 3, 2014.

Episode 5 (October 10) 
The fifth episode was aired on October 10, 2014.

Episode 6 (October 17) 
The sixth episode was aired on October 17, 2014.

Episode 7 (October 24) 
The seventh and last blind audition episode aired on October 24, 2014.

The battles 
After the blind auditions, each coach had fourteen contestants for the battle rounds, which aired from October 31 to November 14, 2014. Coaches began narrowing down the playing field by training the contestants. Each episode featured eight or ten battles consisting of pairings from within each team, and each battle concluding with the respective coach eliminating one of the two contestants. Each coach could steal one losing contestant from another team, thus saving them from elimination. There was no sing-off at the end of the battles.

Color key

Episode 8 (31 October)
The eighth episode aired on October 31, 2014.

Episode 9 (7 November)
The ninth episode aired on November 7, 2014.

Episode 10 (14 November)
The tenth episode aired on November 14, 2014.

Live shows

Live Playoffs (Week 1 & Week 2)

Color key

Four contestants from each team competed in each of the first two live shows, which aired on November 21 and 28, respectively. In either of the two shows, the public vote could save one contestant from each team, the second one being chosen by the coach. The other two contestants were eliminated.

Week 1 (21 November)

Week 2 (28 November)

Quarterfinals (Week 3) 
All 16 remaining contestants competed in the third live show on December 5, 2014. Voting proceeded as before.

Semi-final (Week 4) 
All eight remaining contestants performed two songs each in the semi-final on Saturday, December 12, 2014: a solo song and a trio with the coach and the other contestant in their team. Within each team, the coach and the viewers had a 40/60 say; the contestant with the highest combined percentage went on to the final.

Final (Week 5) 
The top 4 contestants performed in the grand final on Friday, December 19, 2014. This week, the four finalists performed a solo song, a duet with a well-known musician (or group of musicians) and a duet with their coach. The public vote determined the winner, and that resulted in a victory for Tiberiu Albu, Tudor Chirilă's first victory as a coach.

* Flavia, Francesca and Augustin, Maria's siblings, joined Maria and Loredana for the performance.

Elimination chart 
Color key
Artist info

Result details

Overall

Controversies 
Matei Sorescu, Claudiu Zamfira and Cezar Dometi, contestants in season 2, criticized the fourth season, claiming that the contestants' voices had been digitally manipulated.

Ratings

External links 
 Official Vocea României website

References 

2014 Romanian television seasons